Glazypeau Creek is a stream in Garland County, in the U.S. state of Arkansas.

Glazypeau is derived from the French "glaise à Paul", referring to a nearby salt lick.

See also
List of rivers of Arkansas

References

Rivers of Garland County, Arkansas
Rivers of Arkansas